Hettick is a village in Macoupin County, Illinois, United States. The population was 149 at the 2020 census, down from 181 in 2010.

Geography
Illinois Route 111 passes through the village as Main Street, leading north  to Palmyra and south  to Chesterfield.

The village sits on a ridge that drains northwest to Solomon Creek and southeast to Nassa Creek, both part of the Macoupin Creek watershed leading west to the Illinois River.

Demographics

As of the census of 2000, there were 182 people, 83 households, and 55 families residing in the village. The racial makeup of the village was 100.00% White.

There were 83 households, of which 27.7% had children under the age of 18 living with them, 51.8% were married couples living together, 12.0% had a female householder with no husband present, and 33.7% were non-families. 31.3% of all households were made up of individuals, and 15.7% had someone living alone who was 65 years of age or older. The average household size was 2.19 and the average family size was 2.73.

In the village, the population was spread out, with 22.0% under the age of 18, 9.3% from 18 to 24, 26.9% from 25 to 44, 25.3% from 45 to 64, and 16.5% who were 65 years of age or older. The median age was 36 years. For every 100 females, there were 104.5 males. For every 100 females age 18 and over, there were 105.8 males.

The median income for a household in the village was $30,417, and the median income for a family was $35,313. Males had a median income of $31,667 versus $23,750 for females. The per capita income for the village was $14,117. About 5.6% of families and 10.5% of the population were below the poverty line, including 17.6% of those under the age of eighteen and 15.4% of those 65 or over.

References

Villages in Macoupin County, Illinois
Villages in Illinois